Phascolonus was a genus of prehistoric Australian marsupials in the wombat family. The largest species, Phascolonus gigas, weighed as much as 200 kg (450 lb). Phascolonus existed alongside an even larger marsupial, Diprotodon, which weighed as much as three tons and was distantly related to wombats. Both disappeared at the end of the Late Pleistocene in a Quaternary extinction event together with many other large Australian animals.

A two-million-year-old Phascolonus fossil was found alongside that of the crocodilian Quinkana at Tea Tree Cave, near Chillagoe, Queensland.

References

Prehistoric vombatiforms
Prehistoric mammals of Australia
Prehistoric marsupial genera
Pleistocene life
Fossil taxa described in 1872